The Last cabinet of the French Second Republic was formed on 27 October 1851 by President Louis-Napoleon Bonaparte after the dismissal of the Cabinet of Léon Faucher.
It remained in place until the coup of 2 December 1851, when it was replaced by the First cabinet of Louis Napoleon.

Cabinet members

References

Sources

French governments
1851 establishments in France
1851 disestablishments in France
Cabinets established in 1851
Cabinets disestablished in 1851